The 2004 Clemson Tigers football team represented Clemson University during the 2004 NCAA Division I-A football season. Clemson's 600th win came November 20 against South Carolina, a game notable for a brawl between the two teams. Due to the brawl, the Tigers declined a bowl bid in part because of the unsportsmanlike nature of the fight.

Schedule

References

Clemson
Clemson Tigers football seasons
Clemson Tigers football